Jürgen von Alten (12 January 1903 – 28 February 1994) was a German actor, screenwriter and film director. During his career he directed around seventy short and feature films. In 1939 he made the military comedy-drama Shoulder Arms.

Selected filmography

Director
 Stronger Than Regulations (1936)
 Susanne in the Bath (1936)
 Togger (1937)
 The Beaver Coat (1937)
 Shoulder Arms (1939)
 The Mistress of Solderhof (1959)

Actor
 Yorck (1931)
 The Poacher (1953)
 Oh! This Bavaria! (1960)
 The Death of the White Stallion (1985)

References

Bibliography
 Richards, Jeffrey. Visions of Yesterday. Routledge & Kegan Paul, 1973.

External links
 

1903 births
1994 deaths
Actors from Hanover
People from the Province of Hanover
Film people from Hanover
German male film actors
20th-century German male actors
German male writers